Alai Payum Nenjangal is a 1983 Indian Tamil-language film directed by H.Ramesh for D & PG Producations. It stars newcomers.

Cast 

New comers

References

1980 films
1983 films
1980s Tamil-language films
Films scored by Shankar–Ganesh